William Frederick Prisk, Jr. (April 2, 1870 – December 21, 1962) was a California newspaper executive and a politician from California.

Early life 
Prist was born in Grass Valley, California. Prisk's father was William Prisk, a miner. Prisk's mother was Mary (Hosking) Prisk. Prisk's parents were natives of Camborne, Cornwall, England, who settled in  Grass Valley, California.

Career 
Prisk held posts on the Grass Valley Union (editor and publisher), Evening Telegraph (publisher, typesetter, reporter and business manager), Pasadena Star-News (co-owner with his brother Charles H. Prisk), Long Beach Press-Telegram (editor-publisher). He was elected to the California State Senate in 1897, and at the time, was the youngest member of the California State Legislature.   For his many years as editor-publisher of the Press-Telegram, he received the nickname "Mr. Long Beach".

Personal life
Prisk became a naturalized US citizen in 1869. Three years after his death in Long Beach, he was selected to the California Newspaper Publishers Association's Newspaper Hall of Fame.

Legacy 
The William F. Prisk Elementary School in the 
Long Beach Unified School District is named in his honor.

Partial works
 1895 pictorial history of Nevada County, California
 Nevada county mining review

References

External links
Join California William F. Prisk

1870 births
1962 deaths
Democratic Party California state senators
Editors of California newspapers
American newspaper publishers (people)
People from Grass Valley, California
People from Long Beach, California
People with acquired American citizenship
American people of Cornish descent
Journalists from California
20th-century American politicians